Railways Sports Promotion Board (RSPB) (originally known as Railways Sports Control Board) is a sports board run by the Indian Railways. It was formed as the Indian Railways Athletic Association in 1928. It promotes 30 sporting disciplines and owns the Karnail Singh Stadium in New Delhi. The board is represented as Railways in the National Games of India.

Overview
RSPB is a member of the Board of Control for Cricket in India and fields the Railways cricket team in domestic cricket competitions in India such as the Ranji Trophy. It is an associate member of the All India Football Federation and fields the Railways football team in Santosh Trophy. It is also an associate of the Badminton Association of India.

Apart from domestic cricket and football, RSPB has played host to national level events such as the National Weightlifting Championship in 2004, the National Boxing Championship in 2007 and the 56th National Kabaddi Championship in 2004. In 2009, RSPB held the 17th Men's and 14th Women's USIC World Railway Athletics Championship. In the run up to the 2010 Commonwealth Games, the RSPB in coordination with the Ministry of Communications and Information Technology ran a special train, The Commonwealth Express which toured India to promote the games.

Railways teams

Cricket
Railways cricket team
Railways women's cricket team

Football
Railways football team
Railways women's football team

Handball
Railways handball team

See also
Indian Railways
Ministry of Railways
Services Sports Control Board
Sports Authority of India

References

External links 
Official website

Cricket administration in India
Football governing bodies in India
Sport in Indian Railways
Railway associations
Sports governing bodies in India
Recipients of the Rashtriya Khel Protsahan Puruskar
1928 establishments in India
Organizations established in 1928
Organisations based in Delhi